Temira Pachmuss (24 December 1927 in Vasknarva, Ida-Viru County – 1 May 2007 in Urbana, Illinois) was a Russian-American philologist.

In 1939, her family moved to Germany. In the 1950s, she moved to Australia. In 1955, he moved to USA. In 1959, she defended her doctoral thesis at University of Washington in Seattle.

Since 1960, she has taught (since 1968 professor) Russian literature at University of Illinois at Urbana-Champaign.

Her major fields of research were Russian literature outside Russia, including the Russian writers who worked in Finland and Russia. She was especially interested in the legacy by Russian poet Zinaida Gippius.

In 2001, she was awarded with Order of the White Star, medal class.

References

1927 births
2007 deaths
Russian philologists
American philologists
20th-century philologists
University of Washington faculty
University of Illinois Urbana-Champaign faculty